Sania Mirza and Liezel Huber were the defending champions, but Huber chose not to participate this year.

Mirza played alongside Mara Santangelo, but they lost in the semifinals Hsieh Su-wei and Alla Kudryavtseva.

In the final, Chan Yung-jan and Chuang Chia-jung defeated Hsieh and Kudryavtseva to win their title 6–7(4–7), 6–2, [11–9].

Seeds

 Chan Yung-jan   Chuang Chia-jung (champions)
 Sania Mirza   Mara Santangelo (semifinals)
 Yuliya Beygelzimer   Yuliana Fedak (quarterfinals)
 Hsieh Su-wei   Alla Kudryavtseva (final)

Draw

Draw
{{16TeamBracket-Compact-Tennis3
| score-width=20
| font-size=85%
| RD1=First round
| RD2=Quarterfinals
| RD3=Semifinals
| RD4=Finals

| RD1-team01= Y-j Chan C-j Chuang
| RD1-seed01=1
| RD1-score01-1=6
| RD1-score01-2=6
| RD1-score01-3=
| RD1-team02= M Czink A Klepač
| RD1-seed02=
| RD1-score02-1=3
| RD1-score02-2=3
| RD1-score02-3=

| RD1-team03= A Brianti M Koryttseva
| RD1-seed03=
| RD1-score03-1=7
| RD1-score03-2=6
| RD1-score03-3=
| RD1-team04= S Rao O Savchuk
| RD1-seed04=
| RD1-score04-1=5
| RD1-score04-2=4
| RD1-score04-3=

| RD1-team05= Y Beygelzimer Y Fedak
| RD1-seed05=3
| RD1-score05-1=79
| RD1-score05-2=6
| RD1-score05-3=
| RD1-team06= Y Chen S Zhang
| RD1-seed06=
| RD1-score06-1=67
| RD1-score06-2=3
| RD1-score06-3=

| RD1-team07= S Ferguson A Molik
| RD1-seed07=
| RD1-score07-1=6
| RD1-score07-2=2
| RD1-score07-3=[5]
| RD1-team08=
| RD1-seed08=
| RD1-score08-1=3
| RD1-score08-2=6
| RD1-score08-3=[10]

| RD1-team09= C Ji S Sun
| RD1-seed09=
| RD1-score09-1=6
| RD1-score09-2=2
| RD1-score09-3=[10]
| RD1-team10= K Barrois S Klösel
| RD1-seed10=
| RD1-score10-1=3
| RD1-score10-2=6
| RD1-score10-3=[4]

| RD1-team11= C-w Chan M Yuan
| RD1-seed11=
| RD1-score11-1=4
| RD1-score11-2=0
| RD1-score11-3=
| RD1-team12= S-w Hsieh A Kudryavtseva
| RD1-seed12=4
| RD1-score12-1=6
| RD1-score12-2=6
| RD1-score12-3=

| RD1-team13= N Uberoi S Uberoi
| RD1-seed13=
| RD1-score13-1=6
| RD1-score13-2=6
| RD1-score13-3=
| RD1-team14= I Lakhani S Nagaraj
| RD1-seed14=WC
| RD1-score14-1=4
| RD1-score14-2=0
| RD1-score14-3=

| RD1-team15= A Amanmuradova T Poutchek
| RD1-seed15=
| RD1-score15-1=2
| RD1-score15-2=64
| RD1-score15-3=
| RD1-team16= S Mirza M Santangelo
| RD1-seed16=2
| RD1-score16-1=6
| RD1-score16-2=77
| RD1-score16-3=

| RD2-team01= Y-j Chan C-j Chuang
| RD2-seed01=1
| RD2-score01-1=6
| RD2-score01-2=4
| RD2-score01-3=[10]
| RD2-team02= A Brianti M Koryttseva
| RD2-seed02=
| RD2-score02-1=2
| RD2-score02-2=6
| RD2-score02-3=[8]

| RD2-team03= Y Beygelzimer Y Fedak
| RD2-seed03=3
| RD2-score03-1=3
| RD2-score03-2=3
| RD2-score03-3=
| RD2-team04=
| RD2-seed04=
| RD2-score04-1=6
| RD2-score04-2=6
| RD2-score04-3=

| RD2-team05= C Ji S Sun
| RD2-seed05=
| RD2-score05-1=64
| RD2-score05-2=4
| RD2-score05-3=
| RD2-team06= S-w Hsieh A Kudryavtseva
| RD2-seed06=4
| RD2-score06-1=77
| RD2-score06-2=6
| RD2-score06-3=

| RD2-team07= N Uberoi S Uberoi
| RD2-seed07=
| RD2-score07-1=3
| RD2-score07-2=1
| RD2-score07-3=
| RD2-team08= S Mirza M Santangelo
| RD2-seed08=2
| RD2-score08-1=6
| RD2-score08-2=6
| RD2-score08-3=

| RD3-team01= Y-j Chan C-j Chuang
| RD3-seed01=1
| RD3-score01-1=6
| RD3-score01-2=6
| RD3-score01-3=
| RD3-team02=
| RD3-seed02=
| RD3-score02-1=3
| RD3-score02-2=2
| RD3-score02-3=

| RD3-team03=

References

2007 WTA Tour
Bangalore Open